Nandrolone caproate (brand name Anabolin Depot), or nandrolone hexanoate, also known as 19-nortestosterone 17β-hexanoate, is a synthetic androgen and anabolic steroid and a nandrolone ester.

See also
 List of androgen esters § Nandrolone esters

References

Androgens and anabolic steroids
Caproate esters
Nandrolone esters
Progestogens